Football Club Torpedo Moscow (FK Torpedo Moskva), known as Torpedo Moscow, is a Russian professional football club based in Moscow that was founded in 1924 and returned to the Russian Premier League, the top tier of Russian football, for the 2022–23 season. Their colours are white and black, with green also commonly being associated with the club. They play their home games at Eduard Streltsov Stadium, but have been playing at Luzhniki Stadium since their home stadium began a reconstruction project in 2021. 

The new stadium is designed by the architects Michel REMON and Alexis PEYER from the French office MR&A. 

Torpedo are historically one of the big Moscow clubs who enjoyed great domestic success during the Soviet era. In recent history, however, the club has suffered from financial troubles and poor management which has seen them drop down the divisions. A top flight club since 1938, Torpedo were relegated for the first time in their history following the 2006 Russian Premier League season and have only played one campaign in the top division since, in 2014–15, spending the other seasons bouncing around between the second and third tiers. In the 2021–22 season, the club won their first FNL title, and returned to the Russian Premier League.

History

Name history 
AMO (1930–1932) – owned by Avtomobilnoe Moskovskoe Obshchestvo (AMO).
ZIS (1933–1936) – after owner's name AMO was changed to Zavod Imeni Stalina (ZIS).
Torpedo Moscow (1936–July 1996) – when they became one of the founding members of the Soviet 'B' League.
Torpedo-Luzhniki (August 1996 – 1998) – as they became property of the Luzhniki corporation.
Torpedo Moscow (1998–present)

Club history
Torpedo Moscow Football Club (based on Proletarskaya Kuznitsa teams) was formed in 1924 by the AMO automotive plant (later known as "Stalin Automotive Plant – ZIS" and later "Likhachev Automotive Plant – ZIL").

They played in the Moscow League until 1936 when they became one of the founder members of the Soviet 'B' League and changed their name to Torpedo Moscow. In 1938, they were promoted to the 'A' League. In 1949, Torpedo won their first professional title, the USSR Cup. In 1957 Torpedo Moscow, as well as other Soviet sport clubs named "Torpedo", became a part of the republican VSS Trud of the Russian Soviet Federative Socialist Republic.

Nicknamed "the Black-Whites," Torpedo has not been a major force in Russian football since the days of Eduard Streltsov, the brilliant striker of the 1950s and 1960s, known as "the Russian Pelé." In 1960, Torpedo won the double; the Top League and the USSR Cup. 

Torpedo had its glory period in the 1980's and early 90s, when they made six Soviet/Russian Cup finals, winning the 1985–86 Soviet Cup and the 1992–93 Russian Cup, and finished in the top 6 7/8 times from 1983 to 1991.

The club used to belong to the ZIL automobile plant until a fallout in the mid-1990s that resulted in Torpedo leaving their historic ground and moving across town to Luzhniki, as they became property of the Luzhniki corporation and its name was changed to Torpedo-Luzhniki between (1996–1997) before it was renamed Torpedo Moscow. 

After selling Torpedo Moscow in 1996, ZIL created a new team, Torpedo-ZIL (1997), which debuted in the Third Division and reached the Russian Premier League in 2000. However, ZIL sold the team to MMC Norilsk Nickel in 2003, where it was relaunched as FC Moscow. This new team, however, was eventually dissolved after spending the 2010 season in Amateur Football League when its owner and main sponsor, MMC Norilsk Nickel, withdrew funding.

After selling Torpedo-ZIL in 2003, ZIL created another team, Torpedo-ZIL (2003), which began play in the Third Division. This team, however, was also eventually disbanded in 2011 after its efforts to seek promotion to the First Division failed.

Under SC Luzhniki ownership (1996–2009), the team had some high points that had not been reached since the Soviet era, such as finishing in the top four of the Russian Premier League from 1999 to 2002 – including a third-placed finish in 2000 – but were relegated to the First Division in 2006 and after two seasons it fell further to the Second Division. In early 2009, Luzhniki sold the team back to ZiL. For most of this era, the team played at Luzhniki Stadium. 
It was speculated that ZIL would merge Torpedo Moscow and Torpedo-ZIL (2003), but instead an independent Torpedo Moscow spent 2009 in the Amateur Football League, later earning two consecutive promotions to gain a spot in the First Division in 2011. In their first season back in the First Division, the team finished eighth during the first half of the tournament at the end of 2011, taking them through to a Top 8 Promotion playoff during the season's second half.

In the 2012–13 season, Torpedo barely avoided relegation to the second division. At the end of the championship the head coach was replaced once again when 42-year-old Vladimir Kazakov was hired, who played for Torpedo in the past. Several players with experience of playing at the highest level were acquired. However, in the first 6 matches, Torpedo were able to earn only two points; manager Kazakov took the blame and resigned. In 2013, a team led by Aleksandr Borodyuk began to become more competitive, ultimately placing third in the 2013–14 season and securing a playoff spot for promotion to the Premier League. The team drew the previous year's 14th-placed Premier League team, Krylia Sovetov Samara, in a game held on 18 May 2014 at the stadium in suburban Ramenskoye, which ended 2–0 for Torpedo. On 22 May, in the tie's second leg at Metallurg Stadium in Samara, Torpedo played to a draw, thus prevailing on aggregate and returning to the Premier League after an eight-year absence.

The 2014–15 season began poorly for Torpedo in the top division; in the first matchday, the club was defeated 1–4 by CSKA Moscow. At the end of the season, the team was relegated back to the Russian Football National League after finishing second-last, in 15th. Due to a lack of financing, however, Torpedo could only receive licensing for play in the third-tier Russian Professional Football League for 2015–16 season, thus sealing a two-level relegation.

In 2017 Torpedo got a new owner – Roman Avdeev, who is a Russian billionaire and the head of Ingrad real estate development company and Rossium concern.

The Eduard Streltsov Stadium, Torpedo's home stadium, is also owned by Rossium. In 2017 Roman Avdeev announced the reconstruction of the stadium. Work began in 2021, once completed, the capacity will be 15,000 (all-seated).

In July 2018 Erving Botaka's failed transfer back to Torpedo Moscow made headlines across Europe when it was reported the club canceled his contract because the ultras refused to allow a black footballer to play for the club. Torpedo later denied this via an official statement but the Torpedo ultras were adamant with their own statement. At the end of the 2018–19 season, they were promoted back to the second-tier FNL. Torpedo won the 2021–22 Russian Football National League to secure the return to the Premier League for the first time in 16 years on 21 May 2022.

Supporters and rivalries
The fans of Torpedo are "twinned" with the fans of Spartak.

Torpedo's rivalries are with the other Moscow clubs (excluding Spartak), Lokomotiv, CSKA, and Dynamo, with whom they contest the Moscow derbies, as well as FC Zenit Saint Petersburg.

It has been reported that some fans have displayed far-right symbols and banners both during and outside of matches, such as the Celtic Cross and the Swastika, which has been reported negatively by media on several occasions.

Torpedo kits

Ownerships, kit suppliers, and Sponsors

Honours

Domestic competitions

 Russian Football National League
 Winners (1): 2021–22
 Soviet Top League:
 Winners (3): 1960, 1965, 1976 (autumn)
 Runners-up (3): 1957, 1961, 1964
 Soviet Cup / Russian Cup:
 Winners (7): 1949, 1952, 1960, 1968, 1972, 1985–86, 1992–93
 Runners-up (9): 1947, 1958, 1961, 1966, 1977, 1982, 1988–88, 1988–89, 1990–91
 Soviet Super Cup:
 Runners-up (1): 1987

Non-official

Ciutat de Lleida Trophy: 1
 1991

League history

Soviet Union

{|class="wikitable"
|- style="background:#efefef;"
! Season
! Div.
! Pos.
! Pl.
! W
! D
! L
! GS
! GA
! P
!Cup
!colspan=2|Europe
!Top scorer (league)
!Head coach
!Notes
|-
| style="text-align:center;" rowspan="2"|1936
| style="text-align:center;" rowspan="3"|2nd
|align=center|2
|align=center|6
|align=center|3
|align=center|1
|align=center|2
|align=center|10
|align=center|7
|align=center|13
|align=center|—
| style="text-align:center;" colspan="2"|—
|align=left|
|align=left|
|align=center|Spring tourn.
|-
|align=center|4
|align=center|7
|align=center|4
|align=center|0
|align=center|3
|align=center|11
|align=center|7
|align=center|15
|align=center|—
| style="text-align:center;" colspan="2"|—
|align=left|
|align=left|
|align=center|Autumn tourn.
|-
|align=center|1937
|  style="text-align:center; background:lightgreen;"|6
|align=center|12
|align=center|4
|align=center|4
|align=center|4
|align=center|16
|align=center|18
|align=center|24
|align=center|R16
| style="text-align:center;" colspan="2"|—
|align=left|
|align=left|
|align=center|Promoted due to league expansion
|-
|align=center|1938
| style="text-align:center;" rowspan="3"|1st
|align=center|9
|align=center|25
|align=center|9
|align=center|11
|align=center|5
|align=center|51
|align=center|38
|align=center|29
|align=center|R16
| style="text-align:center;" colspan="2"|—
|align=left| Sinyakov – 15 P. Petrov – 15
|align=left| Bukhteev
|align=center|
|-
|align=center|1939
|align=center|9
|align=center|26
|align=center|8
|align=center|7
|align=center|11
|align=center|51
|align=center|51
|align=center|23
|align=center|R64
| style="text-align:center;" colspan="2"|—
|align=left| Zharkov – 13
|align=left| Bukhteev Kvashnin
|align=center|
|-
|align=center|1940
|align=center|11
|align=center|24
|align=center|6
|align=center|6
|align=center|12
|align=center|36
|align=center|50
|align=center|18
|align=center|—
| style="text-align:center;" colspan="2"|—
|align=left| Zharkov – 9
|align=left| Kvashnin
|align=center|
|-
|align=center|1941
| style="text-align:center;" colspan="15"|did not participate
|-
| style="text-align:center;" colspan="16"|No league and cup competitions in 1942–1943
|-
|align=center|1944
| style="text-align:center;" colspan="9"|No competition
|  style="text-align:center; background:#deb678;"|SF
| style="text-align:center;" colspan="2"|—
|align=left|
|align=left|
|align=center|
|-
|align=center|1945
| style="text-align:center;" rowspan="48"|1st
|  style="text-align:center; background:#deb678;"|3
|align=center|22
|align=center|12
|align=center|3
|align=center|7
|align=center|41
|align=center|21
|align=center|27
|align=center|R16
| style="text-align:center;" colspan="2"|—
|align=left| Panfilov – 14
|align=left|
|align=center|
|-
|align=center|1946
|align=center|4
|align=center|22
|align=center|11
|align=center|5
|align=center|6
|align=center|44
|align=center|29
|align=center|27
|  style="text-align:center; background:#deb678;"|SF
| style="text-align:center;" colspan="2"|—
|align=left| A. Ponomaryov – 18
|align=left| V. Maslov
|align=center|
|-
|align=center|1947
|align=center|5
|align=center|24
|align=center|9
|align=center|6
|align=center|9
|align=center|36
|align=center|29
|align=center|24
|  style="text-align:center; background:silver;"|RU
| style="text-align:center;" colspan="2"|—
|align=left| Zharkov – 9
|align=left| V. Maslov
|align=center|
|-
|align=center|1948
|align=center|5
|align=center|26
|align=center|15
|align=center|3
|align=center|8
|align=center|58
|align=center|43
|align=center|33
|align=center|QF
| style="text-align:center;" colspan="2"|—
|align=left| A. Ponomaryov – 19
|align=left| V. Maslov Nikitin
|align=center|
|-
|align=center|1949
|align=center|4
|align=center|34
|align=center|16
|align=center|10
|align=center|8
|align=center|64
|align=center|42
|align=center|42
|  style="text-align:center; background:gold;"|W
| style="text-align:center;" colspan="2"|—
|align=left| A. Ponomaryov – 19
|align=left| Nikitin Kvashnin
|align=center|
|-
|align=center|1950
|align=center|10
|align=center|36
|align=center|13
|align=center|10
|align=center|13
|align=center|57
|align=center|60
|align=center|36
|align=center|R32
| style="text-align:center;" colspan="2"|—
|align=left| V. Ponomaryov – 12
|align=left| Kvashnin
|align=center|
|-
|align=center|1951
|align=center|12
|align=center|28
|align=center|8
|align=center|8
|align=center|12
|align=center|37
|align=center|48
|align=center|24
|align=center|R32
| style="text-align:center;" colspan="2"|—
|align=left| Nechaev – 8
|align=left| Moshkarkin Rzhevtsev
|align=center|
|-
|align=center|1952
|align=center|10
|align=center|13
|align=center|3
|align=center|6
|align=center|4
|align=center|11
|align=center|15
|align=center|12
|  style="text-align:center; background:gold;"|W
| style="text-align:center;" colspan="2"|—
|align=left| Nechaev – 3 Gabichvadze – 3
|align=left| V. Maslov
|align=center|
|-
|align=center|1953
|  style="text-align:center; background:#deb678;"|3
|align=center|20
|align=center|11
|align=center|3
|align=center|6
|align=center|24
|align=center|24
|align=center|25
|align=center|QF
| style="text-align:center;" colspan="2"|—
|align=left| Vatskevich – 9
|align=left| V. Maslov N. Morozov
|align=center|
|-
|align=center|1954
|align=center|9
|align=center|24
|align=center|8
|align=center|6
|align=center|10
|align=center|34
|align=center|34
|align=center|22
|align=center|R16
| style="text-align:center;" colspan="2"|—
|align=left| Vatskevich – 9
|align=left| N. Morozov
|align=center|
|-
|align=center|1955
|align=center|4
|align=center|22
|align=center|10
|align=center|8
|align=center|4
|align=center|39
|align=center|32
|align=center|28
|align=center|R16
| style="text-align:center;" colspan="2"|—
|align=left| Streltsov – 15
|align=left| N. Morozov
|align=center|
|-
|align=center|1956
|align=center|5
|align=center|22
|align=center|8
|align=center|7
|align=center|7
|align=center|40
|align=center|37
|align=center|23
|align=center|—
| style="text-align:center;" colspan="2"|—
|align=left| V. Ivanov – 13
|align=left| Beskov
|align=center|
|-
|align=center|1957
|  style="text-align:center; background:silver;"|2
|align=center|22
|align=center|11
|align=center|6
|align=center|5
|align=center|46
|align=center|23
|align=center|28
|  style="text-align:center; background:#deb678;"|SF
| style="text-align:center;" colspan="2"|—
|align=left| V. Ivanov – 14
|align=left| V. Maslov
|align=center|
|-
|align=center|1958
|align=center|7
|align=center|22
|align=center|7
|align=center|8
|align=center|7
|align=center|51
|align=center|42
|align=center|22
|  style="text-align:center; background:silver;"|RU
| style="text-align:center;" colspan="2"|—
|align=left| V. Ivanov – 14
|align=left| V. Maslov
|align=center|
|-
|align=center|1959
|align=center|5
|align=center|22
|align=center|11
|align=center|3
|align=center|8
|align=center|27
|align=center|23
|align=center|25
|align=center|—
| style="text-align:center;" colspan="2"|—
|align=left| Falin – 7
|align=left| V. Maslov
|align=center|
|-
|align=center|1960
|  style="text-align:center; background:gold;"|1
|align=center|30
|align=center|20
|align=center|5
|align=center|5
|align=center|56
|align=center|25
|align=center|45
|  style="text-align:center; background:gold;"|W
| style="text-align:center;" colspan="2"|—
|align=left| Gusarov – 12
|align=left| V. Maslov
|align=center|
|-
|align=center|1961
|  style="text-align:center; background:silver;"|2
|align=center|30
|align=center|19
|align=center|3
|align=center|8
|align=center|68
|align=center|35
|align=center|41
|  style="text-align:center; background:silver;"|RU
| style="text-align:center;" colspan="2"|—
|align=left| Gusarov – 22
|align=left| V. Maslov
|align=center|
|-
|align=center|1962
|align=center|7
|align=center|32
|align=center|15
|align=center|8
|align=center|9
|align=center|64
|align=center|32
|align=center|48
|align=center|QF
| style="text-align:center;" colspan="2"|—
|align=left| Gusarov – 15
|align=left| Zharkov
|align=center|
|-
|align=center|1963
|align=center|10
|align=center|38
|align=center|12
|align=center|16
|align=center|10
|align=center|46
|align=center|41
|align=center|40
|align=center|R16
| style="text-align:center;" colspan="2"|—
|align=left| V. Ivanov – 17
|align=left| Zolotov N. Morozov
|align=center|
|-
|align=center|1964
|  style="text-align:center; background:silver;"|2
|align=center|33
|align=center|19
|align=center|8
|align=center|6
|align=center|53
|align=center|23
|align=center|46
|align=center|R32
| style="text-align:center;" colspan="2"|—
|align=left| V. Ivanov – 14
|align=left| Zolotov
|align=center|
|-
|align=center|1965
|  style="text-align:center; background:gold;"|1
|align=center|32
|align=center|22
|align=center|7
|align=center|3
|align=center|55
|align=center|21
|align=center|51
|align=center|R32
| style="text-align:center;" colspan="2"|—
|align=left| Streltsov – 12
|align=left| Maryenko
|align=center|
|-
|align=center|1966
|align=center|6
|align=center|36
|align=center|15
|align=center|10
|align=center|11
|align=center|55
|align=center|39
|align=center|40
|  style="text-align:center; background:silver;"|RU
| style="text-align:center;" colspan="2"|—
|align=left| Streltsov – 12
|align=left| Maryenko
|align=center|
|-
|align=center|1967
|align=center|12
|align=center|36
|align=center|12
|align=center|9
|align=center|15
|align=center|38
|align=center|47
|align=center|33
|align=center|QF
|align=center|EC
|align=center|R32
|align=left|4 players – 6
|align=left| N. Morozov V. Ivanov
|align=center|
|-
|align=center|1968
|  style="text-align:center; background:#deb678;"|3
|align=center|38
|align=center|18
|align=center|4
|align=center|6
|align=center|60
|align=center|32
|align=center|50
|  style="text-align:center; background:gold;"|W
|align=center|CWC
|align=center|QF
|align=left| Streltsov – 21
|align=left| V. Ivanov
|align=center|
|-
|align=center|1969
|align=center|5
|align=center|32
|align=center|13
|align=center|10
|align=center|9
|align=center|36
|align=center|27
|align=center|36
|align=center|QF
| style="text-align:center;" colspan="2"|—
|align=left| Pais – 8
|align=left| V. Ivanov
|align=center|
|-
|align=center|1970
|align=center|6
|align=center|32
|align=center|12
|align=center|10
|align=center|10
|align=center|36
|align=center|38
|align=center|34
|align=center|QF
|align=center|CWC
|align=center|R32
|align=left| G. Shalimov – 6
|align=left| V. Ivanov
|align=center|
|-
|align=center|1971
|align=center|7
|align=center|30
|align=center|4
|align=center|20
|align=center|6
|align=center|27
|align=center|27
|align=center|28
|  style="text-align:center; background:#deb678;"|SF
| style="text-align:center;" colspan="2"|—
|align=left| Pais – 6
|align=left| V. Maslov
|align=center|
|-
|align=center|1972
|align=center|9
|align=center|30
|align=center|11
|align=center|9
|align=center|10
|align=center|31
|align=center|33
|align=center|31
|  style="text-align:center; background:gold;"|W
| style="text-align:center;" colspan="2"|—
|align=left| Y. Smirnov – 12
|align=left| V. Maslov
|align=center|
|-
|align=center|1973
|align=center|13
|align=center|30
|align=center|9
|align=center|1+7
|align=center|13
|align=center|28
|align=center|37
|align=center|19
|align=center|R32
| style="text-align:center;" colspan="2"|—
|align=left| Y. Smirnov – 8
|align=left| V. Maslov V. Ivanov
|align=center|
|-
|align=center|1974
|align=center|4
|align=center|30
|align=center|13
|align=center|7
|align=center|10
|align=center|35
|align=center|28
|align=center|33
|align=center|R16
|align=center|CWC
|align=center|R32
|align=left| Nikonov – 12
|align=left| V. Ivanov
|align=center|
|-
|align=center|1975
|align=center|4
|align=center|30
|align=center|13
|align=center|8
|align=center|9
|align=center|42
|align=center|33
|align=center|34
|align=center|R32
| style="text-align:center;" colspan="2"|—
|align=left| Khrabrostin – 7
|align=left| V. Ivanov
|align=center|
|-
| style="text-align:center;" rowspan="2"|1976
|align=center|12
|align=center|15
|align=center|5
|align=center|4
|align=center|6
|align=center|15
|align=center|20
|align=center|14
| style="text-align:center;" rowspan="2"|R16
| style="text-align:center;" rowspan="2"|UC
| style="text-align:center;" rowspan="2"|R16
|align=left| Degterev – 5 Sergey V. Grishin – 5
|align=left| V. Ivanov
|align=center|Spring tourn.
|-
|  style="text-align:center; background:gold;"|1
|align=center|15
|align=center|9
|align=center|2
|align=center|4
|align=center|20
|align=center|9
|align=center|20
|align=left| Khrabrostin – 5 V. Sakharov – 5
|align=left| V. Ivanov
|align=center|Autumn tourn.
|-
|align=center|1977
|  style="text-align:center; background:#deb678;"|3
|align=center|30
|align=center|12
|align=center|13
|align=center|5
|align=center|30
|align=center|23
|align=center|37
|  style="text-align:center; background:silver;"|RU
| style="text-align:center;" colspan="2"|—
|align=left| 4 players – 4
|align=left| V. Ivanov
|align=center|
|-
|align=center|1978
|align=center|8
|align=center|30
|align=center|11
|align=center|11
|align=center|8
|align=center|36
|align=center|29
|align=center|30
|  style="text-align:center; background:#deb678;"|SF
|align=center|EC
|align=center|R32
|align=left| Khrabrostin – 7
|align=left| V. Ivanov
|align=center|
|-
|align=center|1979
|align=center|16
|align=center|34
|align=center|8
|align=center|9
|align=center|17
|align=center|32
|align=center|46
|align=center|24
|align=center|Qual.
|align=center|UC
|align=center|R32
|align=left| N. Vasilyev – 14
|align=left| Salkov
|align=center|
|-
|align=center|1980
|align=center|11
|align=center|34
|align=center|10
|align=center|11
|align=center|13
|align=center|28
|align=center|32
|align=center|30
|align=center|QF
| style="text-align:center;" colspan="2"|—
|align=left| Redkous – 7
|align=left| Salkov
|align=center|
|-
|align=center|1981
|align=center|5
|align=center|34
|align=center|14
|align=center|14
|align=center|6
|align=center|41
|align=center|29
|align=center|38
|align=center|Qual.
| style="text-align:center;" colspan="2"|—
|align=left| Petrakov – 10
|align=left| V. Ivanov
|align=center|
|-
|align=center|1982
|align=center|8
|align=center|34
|align=center|11
|align=center|12
|align=center|11
|align=center|36
|align=center|33
|align=center|32
|  style="text-align:center; background:silver;"|RU
| style="text-align:center;" colspan="2"|—
|align=left| Redkous – 12
|align=left| V. Ivanov
|align=center|
|-
|align=center|1983
|align=center|6
|align=center|34
|align=center|14
|align=center|11
|align=center|9
|align=center|40
|align=center|34
|align=center|38
|align=center|R16
|align=center|CWC
|align=center|R32
|align=left| Petrakov – 11
|align=left| V. Ivanov
|align=center|
|-
|align=center|1984
|align=center|6
|align=center|34
|align=center|15
|align=center|10
|align=center|9
|align=center|43
|align=center|36
|align=center|40
|align=center|QF
| style="text-align:center;" colspan="2"|—
|align=left| Redkous – 14
|align=left| V. Ivanov
|align=center|
|-
|align=center|1985
|align=center|5
|align=center|34
|align=center|13
|align=center|10
|align=center|11
|align=center|42
|align=center|40
|align=center|36
|align=center|R16
| style="text-align:center;" colspan="2"|—
|align=left| Kobzev – 9
|align=left| V. Ivanov
|align=center|
|-
|align=center|1986
|align=center|9
|align=center|30
|align=center|10
|align=center|11
|align=center|9
|align=center|31
|align=center|28
|align=center|30
|  style="text-align:center; background:gold;"|W
| style="text-align:center;" colspan="2"|—
|align=left| Y. Savichev – 12
|align=left| V. Ivanov
|align=center|
|-
|align=center|1987
|align=center|4
|align=center|30
|align=center|12
|align=center|12
|align=center|6
|align=center|35
|align=center|25
|align=center|34
|align=center|QF
|align=center|CWC
|align=center|QF
|align=left| Y. Savichev – 10
|align=left| V. Ivanov
|align=center|
|-
|align=center|1988
|  style="text-align:center; background:#deb678;"|3
|align=center|30
|align=center|17
|align=center|8
|align=center|5
|align=center|39
|align=center|23
|align=center|42
|  style="text-align:center; background:silver;"|RU
| style="text-align:center;" colspan="2"|—
|align=left| Grechnev – 9 A. Rudakov – 9
|align=left| V. Ivanov
|align=center|
|-
|align=center|1989
|align=center|5
|align=center|30
|align=center|11
|align=center|13
|align=center|6
|align=center|40
|align=center|26
|align=center|35
|  style="text-align:center; background:silver;"|RU
|align=center|UC
|align=center|R64
|align=left| Grechnev – 11 Y. Savichev – 11
|align=left| V. Ivanov
|align=center|
|-
|align=center|1990
|align=center|4
|align=center|24
|align=center|13
|align=center|4
|align=center|7
|align=center|28
|align=center|24
|align=center|30
|align=center|QF
|align=center|CWC
|align=center|R16
|align=left| Y. Savichev – 8
|align=left| V. Ivanov
|align=center|
|-
|align=center|1991
|  style="text-align:center; background:#deb678;"|3
|align=center|30
|align=center|13
|align=center|10
|align=center|7
|align=center|36
|align=center|20
|align=center|36
|  style="text-align:center; background:silver;"|RU
|align=center|UC
|align=center|QF
|align=left| Tishkov – 8
|align=left| V. Ivanov Skomorokhov
|align=center|
|}

Russia

{|class="wikitable"
|- style="background:#efefef;"
! Season
! Div.
! Pos.
! Pl.
! W
! D
! L
! GS
! GA
! P
!Cup
!colspan=2|Europe
!Top scorer (league)
!Head coach
!Notes
|-
|align=center|1992
| style="text-align:center;" rowspan="15"|1st
|align=center|11
|align=center|30
|align=center|12
|align=center|6
|align=center|12
|align=center|32
|align=center|30
|align=center|30
|align=center|R32
|align=center|UC
|align=center|R32
|align=left| G. Grishin – 10
|align=left| Skomorokhov Y. Mironov
|align=center|
|-
|align=center|1993
|align=center|7
|align=center|34
|align=center|15
|align=center|8
|align=center|11
|align=center|35
|align=center|40
|align=center|38
|  style="text-align:center; background:gold;"|W
|align=center|UC
|align=center|R32
|align=left| Borisov – 7
|align=left| Y. Mironov
|align=center|
|-
|align=center|1994
|align=center|11
|align=center|30
|align=center|7
|align=center|12
|align=center|11
|align=center|28
|align=center|37
|align=center|26
|align=center|R32
|align=center|CWC
|align=center|R32
|align=left| Afanasyev – 8
|align=left| Y. Mironov Petrenko V. Ivanov
|align=center|
|-
|align=center|1995
|align=center|5
|align=center|30
|align=center|16
|align=center|7
|align=center|7
|align=center|40
|align=center|30
|align=center|55
|align=center|QF
| style="text-align:center;" colspan="2"|—
|align=left| D. Prokopenko – 6 Agashkov – 6
|align=left| V. Ivanov
|align=center|
|-
|align=center|1996
|align=center|12
|align=center|34
|align=center|10
|align=center|11
|align=center|13
|align=center|42
|align=center|51
|align=center|41
|align=center|R32
| style="text-align:center;" colspan="2"|—
|align=left| Kamoltsev – 9
|align=left| V. Ivanov
|align=center|
|-
|align=center|1997
|align=center|11
|align=center|34
|align=center|13
|align=center|6
|align=center|15
|align=center|50
|align=center|46
|align=center|45
|align=center|QF
|align=center|UCIC
|align=center|R64SF
|align=left| Jankauskas – 10
|align=left| Tarkhanov
|align=center|
|-
|align=center|1998
|align=center|11
|align=center|30
|align=center|9
|align=center|10
|align=center|11
|align=center|38
|align=center|34
|align=center|37
|align=center|R16
| style="text-align:center;" colspan="2"|—
|align=left| V. Bulatov – 9
|align=left| Tarkhanov V. Ivanov
|align=center|
|-
|align=center|1999
|align=center|4
|align=center|30
|align=center|13
|align=center|11
|align=center|6
|align=center|38
|align=center|33
|align=center|50
|align=center|R32
| style="text-align:center;" colspan="2"|—
|align=left| Kamoltsev – 12
|align=left| V. Shevchenko
|align=center|
|-
|align=center|2000
|  style="text-align:center; background:#deb678;"|3
|align=center|30
|align=center|16
|align=center|7
|align=center|7
|align=center|42
|align=center|29
|align=center|55
|align=center|R32
| style="text-align:center;" colspan="2"|—
|align=left| Vyazmikin – 8
|align=left| V. Shevchenko
|align=center|
|-
|align=center|2001
|align=center|4
|align=center|30
|align=center|15
|align=center|7
|align=center|8
|align=center|53
|align=center|42
|align=center|52
|align=center|QF
|align=center|UC
|align=center|R128
|align=left| Vyazmikin – 17
|align=left| V. Shevchenko
|align=center|
|-
|align=center|2002
|align=center|4
|align=center|30
|align=center|14
|align=center|8
|align=center|8
|align=center|47
|align=center|32
|align=center|50
|align=center|R32
|align=center|UC
|align=center|R128
|align=left| Semshov – 11
|align=left| V. Shevchenko Petrenko
|align=center|
|-
|align=center|2003
|align=center|8
|align=center|30
|align=center|11
|align=center|10
|align=center|9
|align=center|42
|align=center|38
|align=center|43
|align=center|R32
| style="text-align:center;" colspan="2"|—
|align=left| Shirko – 7
|align=left| Petrenko
|align=center|
|-
|align=center|2004
|align=center|5
|align=center|30
|align=center|16
|align=center|6
|align=center|8
|align=center|53
|align=center|37
|align=center|54
|align=center|R32
|align=center|UC
|align=center|R32
|align=left| Panov – 15
|align=left| Petrenko
|align=center|
|-
|align=center|2005
|align=center|7
|align=center|30
|align=center|12
|align=center|9
|align=center|9
|align=center|37
|align=center|33
|align=center|45
|align=center|QF
| style="text-align:center;" colspan="2"|—
|align=left| Semshov – 12
|align=left| Petrenko
|align=center|
|-
|align=center|2006
|  style="text-align:center; background:pink;"|15
|align=center|30
|align=center|3
|align=center|13
|align=center|14
|align=center|22
|align=center|40
|align=center|22
|align=center|QF
| style="text-align:center;" colspan="2"|—
|align=left| Budylin – 4
|align=left| Petrenko Gostenin
|align=center|Relegated
|-
|align=center|2007
| style="text-align:center;" rowspan="2"|2nd
|align=center|6
|align=center|42
|align=center|21
|align=center|6
|align=center|15
|align=center|75
|align=center|59
|align=center|69
|align=center|R16
| style="text-align:center;" colspan="2"|—
|align=left| Romashchenko – 15
|align=left| R. Sabitov
|align=center|
|-
|align=center|2008
|  style="text-align:center; background:pink;"|18
|align=center|42
|align=center|14
|align=center|7
|align=center|21
|align=center|47
|align=center|69
|align=center|49
|align=center|R32
| style="text-align:center;" colspan="2"|—
|align=left| Popov – 9
|align=left| Dayev
|align=center|Relegated to 4th level dueto financial irregul.
|-
|align=center|2009
|align=center|LFL (4th),"Moscow"
|  style="text-align:center; background:lightgreen;"|1
|align=center|32
|align=center|30
|align=center|0
|align=center|2
|align=center|128
|align=center|19
|align=center|90
|align=center|R64
| style="text-align:center;" colspan="2"|—
|align=left| Aleksei Chereshnev – 23
|align=left| Pavlov
|align=center|Promoted
|-
|align=center|2010
|align=center|3rd, "Centre"
|  style="text-align:center; background:lightgreen;"|1
|align=center|30
|align=center|17
|align=center|6
|align=center|7
|align=center|59
|align=center|26
|align=center|57
|align=center|R32
| style="text-align:center;" colspan="2"|—
|align=left| Burmistrov – 10
|align=left| Chugainov
|align=center|Promoted
|-
|align=center|2011–12
|align=center rowspan=3|2nd
|  style="text-align:center;"|8
|align=center|52
|align=center|17
|align=center|17
|align=center|18
|align=center|63
|align=center|53
|align=center|68
|align=center|R32
| style="text-align:center;" colspan="2"|—
|align=left| Khozin – 9 Dorozhkin – 9
|align=left| Chugainov Belov
|align=center|
|-
|align=center|2012–13
|  style="text-align:center;"|14
|align=center|32
|align=center|6
|align=center|15
|align=center|11
|align=center|29
|align=center|38
|align=center|33
|align=center|R32
| style="text-align:center;" colspan="2"|—
|align=left| Bezlikhotnov – 7
|align=left|  Belov Ignatyev
|align=center|
|-
|align=center|2013–14
|  style="text-align:center; background:lightgreen;"|3
|align=center|36
|align=center|19
|align=center|8
|align=center|9
|align=center|45
|align=center|22
|align=center|65
|align=center|Fourth round
| style="text-align:center;" colspan="2"|—
|align=left| I. Shevchenko – 8
|align=left|  Borodyuk
|align=center| Promoted
|-
|align=center|2014–15
|align=center|1st
|  style="text-align:center; background:pink;"|15
|align=center|30
|align=center|6
|align=center|11
|align=center|13
|align=center|28
|align=center|45
|align=center|29
|align=center|R8
| style="text-align:center;" colspan="2"|—
|align=left| Putsila – 4
|align=left| Savichev Petrakov
|align=center|Relegated to 3rd level
|-
|align=center|2015–16
|align=center rowspan=4|3rd
|  style="text-align:center;"|12
|align=center|26
|align=center|8
|align=center|6
|align=center|12
|align=center|21
|align=center|28
|align=center|30
|align=center|Second round
| style="text-align:center;" colspan="2"|—
|align=left| Tyupikov - 5
|align=left| Petrakov
|align=center|
|-
|align=center|2016–17
|  style="text-align:center;"|3
|align=center|24
|align=center|11
|align=center|9
|align=center|4
|align=center|36
|align=center|19
|align=center|42
|align=center|Fourth round
| style="text-align:center;" colspan="2"|—
|align=left| Gonezhukov - 5   Chernyshov - 5
|align=left| Bulatov
|align=center|
|-
|align=center|2017–18
|  style="text-align:center;"|6
|align=center|26
|align=center|11
|align=center|9
|align=center|6
|align=center|44
|align=center|22
|align=center|42
|align=center|Third Round
| style="text-align:center;" colspan="2"|—
|align=left| Sadykhov - 8
|align=left| Kolyvanov
|align=center|
|-
|align=center|2018–19
|  style="text-align:center; background:lightgreen;"|1
|align=center|26
|align=center|20
|align=center|5
|align=center|1
|align=center|48
|align=center|17
|align=center|65
|align=center|Round of 32
| style="text-align:center;" colspan="2"|—
|align=left| Sergeyev - 16
|align=left| Kolyvanov
|align=center|Promoted
|-
|align=center|2019–20
| style="text-align:center;" rowspan="2"|2nd
|align=center|4
|align=center|27
|align=center|16
|align=center|5
|align=center|6
|align=center|39
|align=center|25
|align=center|53
|align=center|QF
| style="text-align:center;" colspan="2"|—
|align=left| Sergeyev - 14
|align=left| S. Ignashevich
|align=center|
|}

European campaigns
Torpedo Moscow's best campaigns in Europe were reaching the quarter-finals of the 1990–91 UEFA Cup, losing to Brøndby on penalties, and the quarter-finals of the 1986–87 European Cup Winners' Cup, losing to Bordeaux on away goals.

Youth structure
Torpedo have one of Russia's best and largest football education structures, ranging from the club's academy to several football schools around the city associated with the club, who provide financial and technical support to them. Torpedo's football school, which would later become the club's academy, was founded in 1957 and has traditionally been one of the strongest producers of players in Russia with many players making the step-up to the first team and others being moved onto other clubs after graduating from the academy. Torpedo's school has also been under the jurisdiction of Torpedo-ZIL and FC Moscow at various points in history amid changes in the club's ownership.

The club has produced some of Russia's most important players in history, including national team legends, twin brothers Aleksei Berezutski and Vasili Berezutski, Sergei Ignashevich, who would later go on to manage the club and Eduard Streltsov, a club legend who would have Torpedo's stadium named after him. Other graduates of the club's famed academy include former Chelsea and Celtic goalkeeper Dmitri Kharine, Zenit goalkeeper Andrey Lunyov, Pavel Mamaev, Kirill Nababkin, Valentin Ivanov, Valery Voronin, Aleksandr Ryazantsev.

Torpedo's reserve squad, the highest level of their academy, has played professionally in the Russian football pyramid as FC Torpedo-d Moscow (Russian Second League in 1992–93, Russian Third League in 1994–95), FC Torpedo-Luzhniki-d Moscow (Russian Third League in 1996–97) and FC Torpedo-2 Moscow (Russian Second Division in 1998–2000). They have since returned to youth football with FC Torpedo-M currently the final stage of Torpedo's academy, competing in the youth competitions in Russia.

On January 26, 2022, the Board of Directors of Torpedo Moscow decided to revive the Torpedo-2 for its further participation in Russian Football National League 2.

Players

Current squad 
As of 21 February 2023, according to the RPL official website

Reserve team

Out on loan

Personnel

Notable players
Had international caps for their respective countries. Players whose name is listed in bold represented their countries while playing for Torpedo.

USSR/Russia
  Leonid Buryak
  Vyacheslav Chanov
  Viktor Grachyov
  Valentin Ivanov
  Viktor Losev
  Aleksandr Maksimenkov
  Nikolai Manoshin
  Slava Metreveli
  Nikolai Parshin
  Valeriy Petrakov
  Boris Pozdnyakov
  Sergei Prigoda
  Vladimir Sakharov
  Nikolai Savichev
  Yuri Savichev
  Sergey Shavlo
  Eduard Streltsov
  Yuri Susloparov
  Valery Voronin
  Vasili Zhupikov
    Dmitri Kharine
   Andrei Chernyshov
   Oleg Shirinbekov
  Sergey Shustikov
   Igor Chugainov
  Andrei Afanasyev
  Diniyar Bilyaletdinov
  Denis Boyarintsev
  Aleksei Bugayev
  Viktor Bulatov
  Yevgeni Bushmanov
  Vyacheslav Dayev
  Vadim Evseev
  Yury Gazinsky
  Lyubomir Kantonistov
  Dmitri Khokhlov
  Oleg Kornaukhov
  Ilya Kutepov
  Andrey Lunyov
  Pavel Mamayev
  Yuri Matveyev
  Ivan Novoseltsev
  Aleksandr Panov
  Nikolai Pisarev
  Aleksandr Podshivalov
  Denis Popov
  Aleksandr Ryazantsev
  Igor Semshov
  Aleksandr Shirko
  Roman Shishkin
  Igor Smolnikov

  Andrei Solomatin
  Konstantin Zyryanov
   Mukhsin Mukhamadiev
Former USSR countries
Armenia
  Roman Berezovsky
  Vardan Khachatryan
  Arthur Mkrtchyan
  Tigran Petrosyan
  Albert Sarkisyan
  Artyom Simonyan
Azerbaijan
  Daniel Akhtyamov
  Dmitriy Kramarenko
Belarus
  Radaslaw Arlowski
  Denis Laptev
  Andrei Lavrik
  Dmitry Lentsevich
  Alyaksandar Lukhvich
  Maksim Romaschenko
  Dzmitry Rawneyka
  Valer Shantalosau
  Yuri Zhevnov
Georgia
  Giorgi Ghudushauri
  Georgi Kipiani
  Lasha Monaselidze
  Edik Sadzhaya
Kazakhstan
  Aleksandr Familtsev
Moldova
  Mihail Caimacov
  Alexandru Namaşco
  Serghei Namaşco
  Adrian Sosnovschi
Tajikistan
  Arsen Avakov
  Igor Cherevchenko
  Valeri Sarychev
Ukraine
  Oleksandr Pryzetko
  Pavlo Shkapenko
  Serhiy Skachenko
  Serhiy Symonenko
  Valeriy Vorobyov
Uzbekistan
  Khojimat Erkinov
  Alexander Geynrikh

  Aleksandr Sayun
Europe
Bosnia and Herzegovina 
  Igor Savić
  Amir Spahić
  Emir Spahić
Estonia
  Enar Jääger
  Dmitri Kruglov
  Andres Oper
  Andrei Stepanov
  Vladimir Voskoboinikov
  Sergei Zenjov
Iceland
  Arnór Smárason
Latvia
  Juris Laizāns
Lithuania
  Edgaras Jankauskas
  Saulius Klevinskas
  Tomas Mikuckis
  Aidas Preikšaitis
  Tomas Ražanauskas
  Mantas Samusiovas
  Valdas Trakys
  Rimantas Žvingilas
North Macedonia
  Artim Položani
Poland
  Adam Kokoszka
  Marcin Kuś
  Grzegorz Piechna
Romania
  Cristian Dancia
  George Florescu
Serbia
  Đorđe Jokić
Slovenia
  Dalibor Stevanović

Africa
Gambia
  Abdou Jammeh
Nigeria
  Augustine Eguavoen

Asia & Oceania
Australia
  Ivan Franjic

For full list, see :Category:FC Torpedo Moscow players

Player records

Most appearances 
As of the match played 20 April 2007 and according to official site. Players in bold are still currently playing for Torpedo Moscow.

Most goals scored

Managerial history

References

External links

Official club website
A Farewell to Arms: Goodbye Torpedo Moscow

 
Association football clubs established in 1930
Football clubs in Moscow
1930 establishments in Russia
Soviet Top League clubs
Works association football clubs in Russia